Festuca octoflora, also known as Vulpia octoflora,  is an annual plant in the grass family (Poaceae). The common name six week fescue is because it supplies about 6 weeks of cattle forage after a rain.  Other common names include sixweeks fescue, six-weeks fescue, pullout grass, eight-flower sixweeks grass, or eight-flowered fescue.

Range and habitat 
This bunchgrass is native to North America occurring across a large part of Canada, in all of the lower 48 contiguous United States, and Baja California of Mexico. It grows in open, sunny places between shrubs and in burn areas. It is commonly found in burn areas after a fire.

Varieties 
Festuca octoflora/Vulpia octoflora varieties include:
Vulpia octoflora var. glauca   (AKA Festuca octoflora Walter var. tenella, Festuca gracilenta Buckley, Festuca tenella Willd., and Vulpia octoflora var. tenella)
Vulpia octoflora var. hirtella 
Vulpia octoflora var. octoflora

References

External links 
Jepson Manual – Vulpia octoflora

octoflora
Bunchgrasses of North America
Grasses of the United States
Grasses of Canada
Grasses of Mexico
Native grasses of California
Plants described in 1788